Mehmet Çolak (born 22 October 1995) is a Turkish footballer who played one match for Gaziantepspor in Süper Lig on 17 May 2014.

References

External links
 
 Mehmet Çolak at eurosport.com
 Mehmet Çolak at goal.com
 
 

1995 births
Living people
People from Oğuzeli
Turkish footballers
Gaziantepspor footballers
Süper Lig players
Association football midfielders